The women's shot put at the 2015 World Championships in Athletics was held at the Beijing National Stadium on 22 August.

The championship suffered a little with the failure of Valerie Adams to return to defend her 2013 title following surgery over the winter. In the run-up to these championships Adams suffered the end of her 57 event winning streak a month earlier.

In the finals, home favorite Gong Lijiao assumed the early lead with a 20.30 first put.  On the third throw, Christina Schwanitz made 20.37 to take the lead. Gong had no answer and the rest of the field was too far behind, led by Michelle Carter's 19.76. Anita Márton threw a fourth round 19.48m national record to take fourth.

Records
Prior to the competition, the records were as follows:

Qualification standards

Schedule

Results

Qualification
Qualification: Qualifying Performance 18.30 (Q) or at least 12 best performers (q) advanced to the final.

Final
The final was held at 20:05.

References

Shot put
Shot put at the World Athletics Championships
2015 in women's athletics